The 1896 Michigan State Normal Normalites football team represented Michigan State Normal School (later renamed Eastern Michigan University) during the 1896 college football season.  In their first and only season under head coach Fred W. Green, the Normalites compiled a record of 5–1, shut out five of six opponents, and outscored their opponents by a combined total of 116 to 18. Benjamin J. Watters was the team captain.

As of September 27, 1896, as the football season began, the enrollment at Michigan State Normal School was approximately 800 students.

Schedule

References

Michigan State Normal
Eastern Michigan Eagles football seasons
Michigan State Normal Normalites football